Mercedes Otero de Ramos (April 16, 1938 – June 20, 2012) was a Puerto Rican politician and public servant from the Popular Democratic Party (PPD). Otero served as Secretary of the Puerto Rico Department of Corrections and Rehabilitation from 1985 to 1992. After that, she served as member of the Senate of Puerto Rico from 1993 to 2001.

Studies and personal life

Mercedes Otero received a Bachelor's degree in Secondary Education from the University of Puerto Rico. She also completed a Master's degree in Business Education, with a minor in Secretarial Science and Counseling, and a Doctorate in Sociology and Criminology, both from the University of Missouri.

Otero was married to Israel Ramos Perea. They had a son together: Pedro.

Professional career

Otero worked as a teacher in the public school system, in the Puerto Rican College of Girls, and in the University of Puerto Rico for more than 30 years.

Public service: 1985–1992

In 1985, Otero was appointed by Governor Rafael Hernández Colón as Secretary of the Puerto Rico Department of Corrections and Rehabilitation. During her time leading the public agency, the inmates referred to her as "Mamá Meche". During her time, she implemented the first program to grant paroles to certain prisoners with constant electronic surveillance. She also wrote papers on women in the penitentiary system.

In 1992, Otero resigned when she considered that some of the signed agreements from a case couldn't be granted.

Political career: 1992–2001

Otero was elected to the Senate of Puerto Rico in the 1992 general election as a Senator At-large. Otero was reelected at the 1996 general election. Fellow senator Eduardo Bhatia described Otero as her "comrade in arms, mentor, and teacher."

Return to private life and death: 2001–2012

After retiring from the Senate, Otero returned to her private life. In 2002, she suffered a stroke and a myocardial infarction, but recovered.

In March 2012, Otero was honored by the Puerto Rico House of Representatives, along with other female legislators, for her public service. Several months later, she was hospitalized with a swelling in the stomach. It was later revealed that her appendix had broken without noticing, causing the swelling. Otero died on June 20, 2012, at the Hospital del Maestro in Hato Rey a sector of San Juan.

Otero's remains were exposed at Ehret Funeral Home in Río Piedras and cremated the next day after a religious service. Governor Luis Fortuño declared three days of mourning.

See also
 21st Senate of Puerto Rico

References

1938 births
2012 deaths
Deaths from appendicitis
Members of the Senate of Puerto Rico
People from Ciales, Puerto Rico
Puerto Rican educators
Puerto Rican Roman Catholics
University of Missouri alumni
University of Puerto Rico alumni